Terry Asare Boamah, known by the stage name Dada Hafco, is a Ghanaian high-life musician. His song Yebewu Nti was nominated in the 2018 Vodafone Ghana Music Awards as the Highlife Song of the Year. He was also nominated for the Highlife Artiste of the Year in the VGMA for two years in a row.

Early life and career 
He hails from Eastern region. He performed on stage with artistes such as Nero X and Efe Keys. He was formally of a group called Mframa before going solo.

Discography 

 Yebewu Nti feat. Baba Spirit and Yaw Dabo
 Our Story feat Fameye
 'Are you your girlfriend's boyfriend'
 Playboy feat Akwaboah
 Awerekyekyere and 
 Hini Me
 Bedianko
 Friends
 Afutuo
 Fall Down
 Mayentena

Awards 
He won Highlife Song of the Year at the Eastern Music Awards in Koforidua.

Nominations

References 

Living people
Ghanaian musicians
Year of birth missing (living people)